Paul Cotteret (1896-1998) was a French cinematographer.

Selected filmography
 Siren of the Tropics (1927)
 André Cornélis (1927)
 Wine Cellars (1930)
 The Polish Jew (1931)
 Tossing Ship (1932)
 Our Lord's Vineyard (1932)
 Love and Luck (1932)
 The Lacquered Box (1932)
 Three Sailors (1934)
 The Brighton Twins (1936)
 The Porter from Maxim's (1939)
 His Uncle from Normandy (1939)
 The Murderer is Afraid at Night (1942)
 The Inevitable Monsieur Dubois (1943)
 A Cage of Nightingales (1945)
 Fantômas (1946)
 Star Without Light (1946)
 The Faceless Enemy (1946)
 The Wolf (1949)
 Cartouche, King of Paris (1950)
 Thirteen at the Table (1955)
 Mannequins of Paris (1956)

References

Bibliography
 Alpi, Deborah Lazaroff. Robert Siodmak: A Biography, with Critical Analyses of His Films Noirs and a Filmography of All His Works. McFarland, 1998.

External links

1896 births
1998 deaths
French cinematographers
French centenarians
Men centenarians